Gennady Igorevich Gladkov (born 18 February 1935) is a Soviet and Russian composer. He composed music for some of the most famous Soviet movies and cartoons, most notably The Bremen Town Musicians.

Gladkov was born in Moscow. He is a People's Artist of Russia (2002). Commander of the Order "For Merit to the Fatherland" 4th class.

Since 2019, he has been reissuing his catalog — for example, he has released soundtracks for the "Til'" performance, for "Razluchennye" cartoon, the "An Ordinary Miracle", as well as symphonic pieces, music for theater and cinema, etc.

Filmography

Soundtrack
Most, Most, Most, Most (Самый, самый, самый, самый, 1966)
Junior and Karlsson (Малыш и Карлсон, 1968)
The Bremen Town Musicians (Бременские музыканты, 1969)
Karlsson has Returned (Карлсон вернулся, 1970)
The Blue Bird (Синяя птица, 1970)
Gentlemen of Fortune (Джентльмены удачи, 1971)
Train Stop – Two Minutes (Стоянка поезда — две минуты, 1972)
Point, Point, Comma... (Точка, точка, запятая…, 1972)
On the Trail of the Bremen Town Musicians (По следам бременских музыкантов, 1973)
Well, Just You Wait!, eighth episode (Ну, погоди!, 1974)
Til', ("Тиль", 1974)
New Year Adventures of Masha and Vitya (Новогодние приключения Маши и Вити, 1975)
Blue Puppy (Голубой щенок, 1976)
The Twelve Chairs (12 стульев, 1976)
The Dog in the Manger (Собака на сене, 1977)
An Ordinary Miracle (Обыкновенное чудо, 1978)
Ograblenie po... (Ограбление по..., 1978)
Very Blue Beard (Очень синяя борода, 1979)
Life and Adventures of Four Friends 1/2 (Жизнь и приключения четырех друзей 1/2, 1980)
Life and Adventures of Four Friends 3/4 (Жизнь и приключения четырех друзей 3/4, 1981)
The Vacancy (Вакансия, 1981)
I Don't Want to Be an Adult (Не хочу быть взрослым, 1982)
The House That Swift Built (Дом, который построил Свифт, 1982)
Formula of Love (Формула любви, 1984)
After the Rain, on Thursday (После дождичка в четверг, 1985)
Joys of the Youth (Забавы молодых, 1987)
A Man from the Boulevard des Capucines (Человек с бульвара Капуцинов, 1987)
To Kill a Dragon (Убить дракона, 1988)
Two Arrows. Stone Age Detective (Две стрелы. Детектив каменного века, 1989)
Crazies (Чокнутые, 1991)
Breakfast with a View to the Elbrus Mountains (Завтрак с видом на Эльбрус, 1993)
Don Quixote Returns (Дон Кихот возвращается, 1997)
The New Bremen Town Musicians (Новые бременские, 2000)
Carmen (Кармен, 2003)

Voice acting
On the Trail of the Bremen Town Musicians – The King
Formula of Love – Semyon Farada's singing voice
The New Bremen Town Musicians – The Cat, the robbers

References

External links

 Геннадий Гладков — Official Site

1935 births
20th-century composers
20th-century Russian male musicians
21st-century composers
21st-century Russian male musicians
Living people
Academic staff of High Courses for Scriptwriters and Film Directors
Moscow Conservatory alumni
People's Artists of Russia
Recipients of the Nika Award
Recipients of the Order "For Merit to the Fatherland", 4th class
Musicians from Moscow
Male film score composers
Russian ballet composers
Russian film score composers
Russian male composers
Russian male voice actors
Russian music educators
Soviet film score composers
Soviet male composers
Soviet male voice actors
Soviet music educators